Princess Ashi Sonam Dechen Wangchuck (born 5 August 1981) is a princess of Bhutan. She is the daughter of the fourth King of Bhutan Jigme Singye Wangchuck and his wife, Queen Mother Ashi Dorji Wangmo Wangchuck. She is half-sister of the fifth King, Jigme Khesar Namgyel Wangchuck.

Biography 

She was educated at Luntenzampa Middle Secondary School and Yangchenphug Higher Secondary School, Choate Rosemary Hall, Wallingford, Connecticut.

She has a degree in international relations from Stanford University (1999) and a masters in law from Harvard Law School (2007).  She has also clerked for the Royal High Court of Bhutan. She currently works at the Judiciary of the Kingdom of Bhutan as President of the Bhutan National Legal Institute (BNLI).

Marriage and children
She married a distant relative, Dasho Phub W. Dorji (born on 1 January 1980) at the Motithang Palace on 5 April 2009. He is a son of Dasho Zepon Wangchuck, a former monk, Chief Architect and project manager, from Takchu Gompa, Haa, by his wife, Aum Ugyen Dolma, from Gaselo. Dasho Phub W. Dorji has a master's degree in Public Policy from Georgetown University in Washington, D.C. and bachelor's degree in Business Administration and Economics from George Washington University. His thesis was "An Assessment of the Income and Education Determinants of Party Identification in the United States". He topped the 2004 civil service examinations and currently works in the Finance Ministry. He was a director of the Bank of Bhutan.

They have two sons:

 Dasho Jigje Singye Wangchuck (born on 3 December 2009).
 Dasho Jigme Jigten Wangchuck, Tulku Vairotsana (born on 23 August 2013). Recognized by the 70th Je Khenpo, Jigme Choedra, as the reincarnation of the Great Lotsawa (The Translator) Vairotsana.

Patronages 
 Board Member of the Tarayana Foundation (TF).

Official visits 
 24 October 2017 – Japan.
 3 October 2022 – Japan.

Titles and styles

 5 August 1981 – present: Her Royal Highness Princess Ashi Sonam Dechen Wangchuck.

See also
 House of Wangchuck
 Line of succession to the Bhutanese throne

References

External links
 The world's most eligible princesses, Princess Sonam of Bhutan (photo)
 Her marriage
 Top Ten Desired Single Princesses Worldwide, among them : Princess Sonam of Bhutan (photo)
 An interview

|-

Bhutanese monarchy
Harvard Law School alumni
Stanford University alumni
Living people
1981 births
McCourt School of Public Policy alumni
George Washington University School of Business alumni
Wangchuck dynasty
Choate Rosemary Hall alumni